Sir Walter Covert (c. 1544 – 27 January 1632) was an English politician who sat in the House of Commons several times during the late sixteenth and early seventeenth centuries.

Covert was the eldest surviving son of Richard Covert of Slaugham, Sussex. He was educated at Gray's Inn in 1567. He was knighted in 1591.

He was appointed High Sheriff of Surrey and Sussex for 1583–84 and 1592–93. In 1581, 1586, 1614 and 1626 he was elected Member of Parliament (MP) for Sussex, in 1584 for Newport, Cornwall and in 1593 for Petersfield.

He married twice: firstly Timothea, the daughter of John Lennard of Chevening, Kent and secondly Jane, the daughter and coheiress of Sir John Shurley of Isfield, Sussex. He died childless and was succeeded by his niece, who outlived him by only a few months. His widow remarried as her second husband John Freke, and as her third the statesman Denzil Holles, 1st Baron Holles.

References

1540s births
1632 deaths
English MPs 1572–1583
English MPs 1584–1585
English MPs 1586–1587
English MPs 1593
English MPs 1614
English MPs 1626
Members of Gray's Inn
High Sheriffs of Surrey
High Sheriffs of Sussex
People from Slaugham